Lyall Franklin Hanson (July 20, 1929 – April 23, 2018) was a political figure in British Columbia. He represented Okanagan North from 1986 to 1991 and Okanagan-Vernon from 1991 to 1996 in the Legislative Assembly of British Columbia as a Social Credit then Reform Party member.

He was born in Domremy, Saskatchewan, the son of John Engmond Hanson and Katherine Gertrude Ruep. In 1984, Hanson married Nancy McGaw. He was a car dealer in Vernon and Vancouver in British Columbia. He served as mayor of Vernon before entering provincial politics. Hanson served in the provincial cabinet as Minister of Labour and Consumer Services from 1986 to 1989 and as Minister of Municipal Affairs from 1989 to 1991. He was named interim leader for the Social Credit party in 1994 but soon after joined the Reform Party. He died in Vernon, British Columbia in 2018 at the age of 88.

References 

1929 births
2018 deaths
British Columbia Social Credit Party leaders
British Columbia Social Credit Party MLAs
Reform Party of British Columbia MLAs
Mayors of places in British Columbia
Members of the Executive Council of British Columbia
People from Rural Municipality St. Louis No. 431, Saskatchewan